Petrochromis fasciolatus is a species of cichlid endemic to Lake Tanganyika found on rocky substrates where they can graze. It can be found in the aquarium trade.

References

fasciolatus
Taxa named by George Albert Boulenger
Fish described in 1914
Taxonomy articles created by Polbot